"She Has Funny Cars" is a song by the American rock group Jefferson Airplane. Vocalist Marty Balin wrote the lyrics, while guitarist Jorma Kaukonen supplied the music. The song appeared as the opening track on their breakthrough album, Surrealistic Pillow (1967).

Overview
The lyrics reflect on materialism in American society. In a song review for AllMusic, Matthew Greenwald commented:

Personnel
The song features Jack Casady on fuzz bass. Balin sings the first part with Grace Slick's contrasting second part.
Marty Balinlead vocals, percussion 
Grace Slickvocals
Jorma Kaukonenlead guitar
Paul Kantnerrhythm guitar, vocals
Jack Casadybass guitar, fuzz bass
Spencer Drydendrums

References

1967 songs
Jefferson Airplane songs
Songs written by Marty Balin
Song recordings produced by Rick Jarrard